Open Bionics is a UK-based company that develops low-cost, 3D printed bionic arms for amputees with below elbow amputations. Their bionic arms are fully functional, with lights, bio feedback vibrations, and different functions that allow the user to grab, pinch, high-five, fist bump, and thumbs-up. The company is based inside Future Space, co-located with Bristol Robotics Laboratory. The company was founded in 2014 by Joel Gibbard MBE and Samantha Payne MBE.

In 2020 Joel Gibbard and Samantha Payne were awarded MBEs for their services to Innovation, Engineering, and Technology.

Partnerships 
In 2015, Disney and Open Bionics announced a partnership to create superhero-themed prosthetics for young amputees. In the same year, the company won the 2015 James Dyson Award in the UK for innovative engineering  and Tech4Good's 2015 Accessibility Award. In 2016, it won a Bloomberg Business Innovators award.

In January 2019, James Cameron and 20th Century Fox partnered with Open Bionics to give 13-year-old double amputee Tilly Lockey a pair of Alita-inspired bionic Hero Arms for the London premiere of Alita: Battle Angel. Lockey lost both of her hands when she contracted meningococcal septicemia at 15 months of age.

In 2020, Open Bionics partnered with gaming company Konami to create 'Venom Snake' Hero Arm covers, which are featured in the 2015 video game Metal Gear Solid V: The Phantom Pain.

Funding 
In January 2019, Open Bionics raised Series A funding of $5.9 million. The round was led by Foresight Williams Technology EIS Fund, Ananda Impact Ventures and Downing Ventures, with participation from F1's Williams Advanced Engineering Group among others.

References

External links

Bionics
Medical technology companies of the United Kingdom
Prosthetic manufacturers
Engineering companies of England
Companies based in Bristol
2014 establishments in England
English brands